Misha and the Wolves is a 2021 documentary film written and directed by Sam Hobkinson. The film examines the fraudulent 1997 Holocaust memoir of Misha Defonseca.

The film premiered at the 2021 Sundance Film Festival on January 31, 2021. On August 11, 2021, it became available on Netflix.

Synopsis 
After Defonseca's memoir, titled Misha: A Mémoire of the Holocaust Years, became a global success, her publisher began to question its veracity.

Interviewees

Reception 
 The website's critics consensus reads, "A stranger-than-fiction account of a too-incredible-to-be-true story, Misha and the Wolves is an engaging documentary wrapped in a thrilling mystery."

References

External links 
 
 

2021 films
2021 drama films
Films about fraud
Documentary films about women
Biographical films about fraudsters